Krystyna Lenkowska (born 1957) is a Polish poet and translator. She has been included in the representative anthology of Polish women poets Scattering the Dark (White Pine Press 2016, Buffalo-New York). Her translation of poems by Emily Dickinson, the Brontës, Michael Ondaatje, Anne Carson, Ruth Padel, Dana Gioia have been published in the literary Polish journals and books. She lives in Rzeszow.

Career as a writer
Her poems, fragments of prose, translations, essays, notes and interviews have been published in literary magazines in Poland including: Akcent, Fraza, Nowa Okolica Poetów, Odra, Pobocza, Pracownia, Przekrój, Topos, Twórczość, Tygiel, Wyspa, Zeszyty Literackie, and Znad Wilii. In the US, in Ewa Hryniewicz-Yarbrough’s translation, some of her poems have appeared in Absinthe, Boulevard, Chelsea, Confrontation, The Normal School, and Spoon River Poetry Review. In Ukraine her poems have been published in the translation by Wasyl Machno, Evgen Baran’s, Oleksander Gordon and Natalia Belczenko. Her poems have also appeared in Albania, Bosnia and Herzegovina, Czech Republic, India, Israel, Lithuania, Macedonia, Mexico, Mongolia, Romania, Slovakia, and Taiwan. The poem "The Eye of John Keats in Rome" received the first prize at the international competition in Sarajevo "Seeking for a Poem" for the year 2012. In 2013, the poet received the second prize “Menada” at the international festival of poetry DITET E NAIMIT (XVII edition in Macedonia and Albania). In 2019 in Bhubaneswar, India she was awarded 3rd place in the 39th World Congress of Poets.

Music lyrics

Lenkowska is the author of lyrics recorded by Beata Czernecka from “Piwnica pod Baranami”, Bożena Boba-Dyga, Zbigniew Działa (RSC) and Paweł Czachur (Ratatam).

Associations 
She is a member of ASSOCIATION OF POLISH WRITERS (SPP), POLISH LITERARY TRANSLATORS ASSOCIATION (STL), ZAiKS.

Poetry in Polish 

1991 Walc Prowincja / Rzeszów
2002 Pochodnio, Różo / Nowy Świat, Warszawa
2003 Wiersze okienne / Podkarpacki Instytut Książki, Rzeszów
2008 Sztuka Białego / Instytut Wydawniczy Erica, Warszawa
2010 Tato i inne miejsca / Miniatura, Kraków
2013 Kry i wyspy / Mitel, Rzeszów
2020 Kiedy byłam rybą (lub ptakiem) / Biblioteka Stowarzyszenia Pisarzy Polskich, Kraków
2021 Balkon / Fundacja Słowo i Obraz, Augustów

Bilingual poetry 

1999 Keep off the Primroses / Nie deptać przylaszczek, translation into English: Krystyna Lenkowska / YES, Rzeszów
2005 Eve's Choice / Wybór Ewy / Polski Instytut Wydawniczy, Warszawa, translation into English: Ewa Hryniewicz-Yarbrough
2014 Zaległy list do pryszczatego anioła / An Overdue Letter to a Pimply Angel / Mitel, Rzeszów, translation into English: Ewa Hryniewicz-Yarbrough
2014 Турбота / Lviv, translation into Ukrainian: Oleksander Gordon
2017 Fragment de dialogue, translation into French: I’sabelle Macor / L’Harmattan, Paris
2017 Carte Orange, translation into French: Tomasz Wojewoda / Eperons-Ostrogi, Kraków

Prose 

2016 Babeliada / FRAZA, Rzeszów

Translation 

2018 Jest pewien ukos światła Emily Dickinson, tłumaczenie i wstęp: Krystyna Lenkowska / Officyna, Łódź
2021 Emily Dickinson, Wybór poezji / Biblioteka Narodowa

Audiobook 
 2014 I nic się nie stało / Wojewódzka i Miejska Biblioteka Publiczna w Rzeszowie
2018 Babeliada / Wojewódzka i Miejska Biblioteka Publiczna w Rzeszowie

References

External links 
 Official website Krystyna Lenkowska
 https://www.facebook.com/krystalenko
 http://sppwarszawa.pl/czlonkowie/krystyna-lenkowska/

1957 births
Polish translators
Polish women poets
Living people
20th-century Polish poets
21st-century Polish poets
21st-century Polish women writers
20th-century Polish women writers